Kati Patang is a 1971 Indian Hindi-language musical drama film produced and directed by Shakti Samanta. It was a box office success. The film stars Asha Parekh as a woman pretending to be a widow, and her ensuing trials and tribulations opposite her charming neighbour, played by Rajesh Khanna.  Parekh's performance as Madhavi was critically acclaimed and earned her the Filmfare Award for Best Actress.

The movie also stars Nazir Hussain, Bindu, Prem Chopra, Daisy Irani and Sulochana Latkar. The film was the second in a string of nine films on which Samanta and Khanna collaborated. The music was composed by R.D. Burman and was a huge hit. "Ye Shaam Mastani" and "Pyaar Deewana Hota Hai", sung by Kishore Kumar were particularly famous. The performances from Parekh and Khanna were praised by the audience and critics alike. The film was among the 17 consecutive hits of Khanna between 1969 and 1971 and was the second of four films in which he was paired with Parekh. The film was later remade in Tamil as Nenjil Oru Mul (1981) and in Telugu as Punnami Chandrudu (1987). It is based on Cornell Woolrich's 1948 novel I Married a Dead Man which had earlier been adapted as the 1950 film No Man of Her Own.

Plot 
Madhavi "Madhu" is an orphan living with her maternal uncle, who arranges her marriage with someone she does not know. Blinded in love with Kailash, she runs away on the day of the marriage. She discovers Kailash with another woman, Shabnam. Heartbroken and dejected, she returns to her uncle, who had committed suicide from the humiliation. Realising that she has no one in life, Madhavi decides to leave town and head somewhere. She meets her childhood friend Poonam, who tells her about her husband's untimely demise in an accident and that she is on her way, along with her baby boy Munna, to stay with her in-laws whom she has never met before. Poonam manages to compel Madhu to accompany her as her plight is pitiful.

En route, Poonam and Madhu catch up until the train derails and end up in a government hospital. Poonam has lost her limbs. She knows that her end is near, so she makes Madhu promise that she will assume Poonam's identity, bring Munna up and continue life in Poonam's in-law's house. Madhu has no choice but to give in to a dying mother's wish. In the downpour on the way, the cabbie attempts to rob her but Kamal, a forest ranger, rescues her and gives her shelter until the sky is clear the next day. She learns that Kamal is the very man with whom her marriage was arranged.

Madhu leaves Kamal's home in shame and reaches Poonam's in-laws. Her father-in-law, Dinanath and mother-in-law accept her and let her stay there. Kamal keeps visiting the house as he was the son of Dinanath's best friend. Soon, he realises that he is in love with "Poonam".

Madhu's ill fate brings Kailash to Dinanath's house. He is after their money and is very close to revealing Madhu's identity. To be successful, he impresses all the members of the house, but Poonam takes a resentment to him. Dinanath soon realises Poonam's true identity and asks for the truth. When he realises what the matter really is, he accepts Madhavi and makes her the guardian of the Dinanath property which will be inherited by Munna. That night, Dinanath is poisoned by Kailash. Mrs. Dinanath accuses Poonam for what has happened and she is imprisoned.

Now Shabnam enters the life of the Dinanaths claiming that she is the real Poonam. Mrs. Dinanath, in rage, sends her away and is ready for no story. Kamal takes a dislike towards Madhu, learning the truth. However, he eventually realises the truth and gets Shabnam and Kailash arrested for their evil intentions and Madhavi is freed. When Kamal searches for Madhu, he realises that she has left without any notice, but a letter for Kamal, stating that she is going out of his life and so, he should not try to find her out. Kamal starts searching for her and finds her trying to jump from a cliff and stops her by singing a song. They hug.

Cast 
 Asha Parekh as Madhavi "Madhu" / Fake Poonam
 Rajesh Khanna as Kamal Sinha
 Prem Chopra as Kailash
 Bindu as Shabnam "Shaboo"
 Nazir Hussain as Diwan Dinanath
 Madan Puri as Kamal's Father
 Kumari Naaz as Real Poonam (uncredited)
 Sulochana Latkar as Mrs. Dinanath
 Chandrashekhar as Police Inspector Tiwari
 Satyen Kappu as Dr. Kashinath
 Daisy Irani as Ramaya
Mehmood Jr. as Sheetu, Ramaya's brother

Production 
Kati Patang was adapted from the novel of the same name by Gulshan Nanda. The film's story, also written by Nanda, was also based on the novel I Married a Dead Man, by Cornell Woolrich and had been previously made into a picture titled No Man of Her Own (1950) starring Barbara Stanwyck. The novel was also later filmed in Japanese as Shisha to no Kekkon (1960), in Brazilian as the TV miniseries A Intrusa (1962), in French as J'ai épousé une ombre (I Married a Shadow) (1983) and by Hollywood as Mrs. Winterbourne (1996). Shakti Samanta has stated that he cast Parekh, because he was "confident" that he could extract a "convincing performance from her." He had cast her in his earlier film, Pagla Kahin Ka (1971).

Music 

The music was composed by Rahul Dev Burman and the lyrics were penned by Anand Bakshi. The songs sung by Kishore Kumar for Rajesh Khanna were the reason of film success, while Mukesh got to sing a number for the latter – a rare combination. Asha Bhosle performed "Mera Naam Hai Shabnam" in the talk-sung style of Rex Harrison in My Fair Lady (1964) (and thus often incorrectly dubbed "the first Hindi rap number").

Soundtrack

Box office 
The film was successful at the box office, becoming the sixth highest-grossing Bollywood film of 1971.

According to The Hindu, "On screen, Rajesh Khanna never appeared to be lip-syncing. So convincing were his expressions. His presence, backed by the music, remained the main source of strength for a movie's success".

Awards and nominations 
19th Filmfare Awards:
Won

 Best Actress – Asha Parekh

Nominated

 Best Director – Shakti Samanta
 Best Actor – Rajesh Khanna
 Best Lyricist – Anand Bakshi – "Na Koi Umang Hai"
 Best Male Playback Singer – Kishore Kumar – "Yeh Jo Mohabbat Hai"
Best Story – Gulshan Nanda

References 

http://www.thehindu.com/features/friday-review/blast-from-the-past-kati-patang-1971/article6506448.ece

External links 
 

1971 films
1970s Hindi-language films
Indian family films
Indian drama films
Films scored by R. D. Burman
Films directed by Shakti Samanta
Films based on American novels
Films about widowhood in India
Hindi films remade in other languages
Films shot in Uttarakhand
1971 drama films
Hindi-language drama films